John L. Withers II (born 1948) is an American politician and diplomat.

Biography
Born in 1948, Withers graduated from Harvard University in 1971 with a Bachelor's Degree in History.  He earned his Master of Arts Degree in East Asian Studies from McGill University in 1975.   A year after graduating from Yale University (1983), with a Doctor of Philosophy degree in Modern Chinese History, Withers began pursuing his Foreign Service career.  His first posting was as a political officer at The Hague from 1985 to 1986. He later had several diplomatic postings, including in Nigeria, Russia and Ireland.

Withers was appointed Ambassador to Albania by President George W. Bush in August 2007. He was replaced by Alexander Arvizu on November 10, 2010.

References

External links
U.S Department of State – John L. Withers II

Living people
African-American diplomats
Ambassadors of the United States to Albania
Harvard College alumni
Yale Graduate School of Arts and Sciences alumni
United States Foreign Service personnel
1948 births
McGill University alumni
21st-century African-American people
21st-century American diplomats
20th-century African-American people